Vikas Jha is an Indian journalist and author. He is best known for his fiction and non-fiction works like McCluskieganj: The story of the only Anglo-Indian Village in India which was awarded with the Katha UK Honour at the House of Commons, London. He has also written: Varshavan ki Roopkatha, a novel based on Agumbe village, Bihar: Criminalization of Politics, Satta ke Sutradhar: Azadi ke baad Bharat, Bhog: A novel, and Parichaya Patra: Essays in Bengali.
His upcoming novel is based on Bodhgaya named Gayasursandhan. He is also working on his next book that is based on Goa.

Early life 
Jha was born in village Shrikhandi Bhittha in the Sitamarhi district of Bihar in 1961. He studied M.A. in sociology at Patna University and started his career in journalism in Bihar at the age of 18.

Journalism 
He has worked with reputed publications like Maya magazine, Ravivaar and Outlook magazine. Jha covered various political, social and cultural issues in a span of 35 years in Hindi Journalism. He has been the editor of Hindi Magazine Rashtriya Prasang.

Electronic media 
Jha also anchored a few talk shows for ETV Bihar like Aamne Samne, a talk show with figures from across political, social and cultural platforms, Suno Patliputra, Kya bole Bihar and a multiple news features and talk shows for news channel News Express which he was heading in the year 2013–2014.

References

Living people
1961 births
Novelists from Bihar
Patna University alumni
Indian male novelists
Indian male journalists
People from Sitamarhi district
20th-century Indian novelists
20th-century Indian male writers